Four regiments of the British Army have been numbered the 71st Regiment of Foot:
 71st Regiment of Foot (Invalids), raised as the 81st Regiment of Foot in 1757, re-numbered as the 71st Regiment of Foot in 1764 and disbanded in 1768
 71st Regiment of Foot, raised by re-designation of the 2nd Battalion, 32nd Regiment of Foot in 1758 and disbanded in 1763
71st Regiment of Foot, Fraser's Highlanders, raised in 1775 and disbanded in 1786
71st (Highland) Regiment of Foot, raised in 1777 as the 73rd (Highland) Regiment of Foot (MacLeod's Highlanders) and re-numbered in 1786